CompStat—or COMPSTAT, short for COMPuter STATistics, is a computerization and quantification program used by police departments. It was originally set up by the New York City Police Department in the 1990s. Variations of the program have since been used in police departments across the world. According to a 2022 podcast by Peter Moskos with John Yohe and Billy Gorta, the name CompStat was suggested by detective Richard Mahere for the computer file name of the original program to comply with 8.3 filename conventions, short for "COMParative STATistics" and "COMPuter STATistics".

Origins
CompStat was started under the direction of Jack Maple when he was a transit police officer in New York City. The system was called Charts of the Future and was simple – it tracked crime through pins stuck in maps. Charts of the Future is credited with cutting subway crime by 27 percent.

The original commanding officer of the Transit Police Crime Analysis Unit was Lieutenant Richard Vasconi. Chief of New York City Transit Police William J. Bratton was later appointed police commissioner by Rudolph Giuliani, and he brought Maple's Charts of the Future with him. Maple eventually made the NYPD adopt it after it was rebranded as CompStat, and it was credited with helping to bringing down crime by around 60%. There was a CompStat meeting every month, and it was mandatory for police officials to attend. The year after CompStat was adopted, 1995, murders dropped to 1,181. By 2012, there were 417 murders—the lowest number since records start in 1964.

Operations

Weekly crime reports
On a weekly basis, personnel from each of the NYPD's 77 precincts, nine police service areas and 12 transit districts compile a statistical summary of the week's crime complaints, arrests and summons activity, as well as a written report of significant cases, crime patterns and police activities. This data, with specific crime and enforcement locations and times, is forwarded to the chief of the department's CompStat Unit, where information is collated and loaded into a citywide database.

The unit runs computer analysis on the data and generates a weekly CompStat report. The report captures crime complaints and arrest activity at the precinct, patrol borough and citywide levels, presenting a summary of these and other important performance indicators.

The data is presented on a week-to-date, prior 28 days and year-to-date basis, with comparisons to previous years' activity. Precinct commanders and members of the department's senior officers can easily discern emerging and established crime trends, as well as deviations and anomalies. With the report, department leadership can easily make comparisons between commands. Each precinct is also ranked in each complaint and arrest category.

Accountability
The CompStat program involves weekly crime control strategy meetings. These gatherings increase information flow between the agency's executives and the commanders of operational units, with particular emphasis on  crime and quality of life enforcement information. In the department's vernacular, these briefings are referred to as CompStat ("computerized statistics") meetings, since many of the discussions are based upon the statistical analysis and maps contained within the weekly CompStat reports.

These meetings and the information sharing they generate are an important part of Bratton's comprehensive, interactive management strategy: enhancing accountability by providing local commanders with considerable discretion and resources. The program also ensures that precinct commanders remain aware of crime and quality of life conditions within their areas of responsibility. By meeting frequently and discussing the department's ten crime and quality of life strategies, the initiatives are fully implemented throughout the agency.

Precinct and other operational unit commanders use this forum to communicate with the agency's top executives and other commanders, sharing the problems they face and successful crime reduction tactics. The process allows top executives to monitor issues and activities within precincts and operational units, evaluating the skills and effectiveness of middle managers. By keeping abreast of situations "on the ground," departmental leaders can properly allocate resources to most effectively reduce crime and improve police performance.

It is important to note that the weekly CompStat report and crime strategy meetings do not focus simply on enforcement of the seven major crimes comprising the FBI's Uniform Crime Reports (UCR) Index, but also capture data on the number of shooting incidents and shooting victims, as well as gun arrests. Summons and arrest activity are also captured.

In concert with broken windows theory
By arresting or issuing summonses to people who engage in minor violations and quality of life offenses — such as public drinking and public urination, panhandling, loud radios, prostitution and disorderly conduct — ensures that those behaviors are deterred. As explained in the Broken windows theory, aggressive enforcement of all statutes has been claimed to restore a sense of order. By capturing enforcement data as reflected in summons and arrest activity, the department is better able to gauge its overall performance.

Commander profile reports
The CompStat Unit also develops and prepares commander profile reports. These weekly reports help executives scrutinize commanders' performance on a variety of important management variables. All profiles furnish information about the unit commander's appointment date and years in rank, the education and specialized training he or she has received, his or her most recent performance evaluation rating, and the units he or she previously commanded.

Every profile also captures some non-crime statistics: the amount of overtime generated by members of the command, the number of department vehicle accidents, absence rates due to sick time and line-of-duty injuries, and the number of civilian complaints logged against members of the unit.

Community demographics and information on the unit's personnel is also included. With this data, executives can monitor and assess how commanders motivate and manage their personnel resources and how well they address important management concerns. The commander profile also acts as a motivational tool; profile subjects are familiar with the criteria used to evaluate them—and their peers—enabling report subjects to monitor and compare their own success in meeting performance objectives with others' achievements.

Crime strategy meetings
Crime strategy meetings are convened twice weekly in the Command and Control Center, a high-tech conference facility at police headquarters. These meetings are attended by all commanders of precincts, police service areas, transit districts and other operational unit commanders within a given patrol borough, including the commanding officers and /or supervisors of precinct-based and specialized investigative units. Depending on their weekly crime statistics, every commander can expect to be called at random to make his or her Crime Strategy Meeting presentation approximately once a month.

Also in attendance are representatives from the respective district attorney's offices, command personnel from the department's School Safety Division and a variety of other outside agencies involved in law enforcement activities, the Transit and Housing Bureau commanders whose jurisdictions lie within the patrol borough, the Crime Strategy Coordinators from other patrol boroughs, Internal Affairs Bureau personnel, and ranking officers from a variety of support and ancillary units (such as the Legal Bureau and Management Information Systems Division) which do not perform direct enforcement functions.

This configuration of participants fosters a team approach to problem solving, and ensures that crime and quality of life problems identified at the meeting can be immediately discussed and quickly addressed through the development and implementation of creative and comprehensive solutions. Because ranking decision-makers are present at the meetings and can immediately commit their resources, the obstacles and delays which often occur in highly structured bureaucratic organizations also tend to be minimized.

Among the Command and Control Center's high-tech capabilities is its computerized "pin mapping" which displays crime, arrest and quality of life data in a host of visual formats including comparative charts, graphs and tables. Through the use of geographic mapping software and other computer technology, for example, the CompStat database can be accessed and a precinct map depicting virtually any combination of crime and/or arrest locations, crime "hot spots" and other relevant information can be instantly projected on the Center's large video projection screens.

Comparative charts, tables and graphs can also be projected simultaneously. These visual presentations are a useful and highly effective adjunct to the CompStat Report, since it permits precinct commanders and members of the Executive Staff to instantly identify and explore trends and patterns as well as solutions for crime and quality of life problems.

During their presentation, members of the executive staff frequently ask commanders probing questions about crime and arrest activity as well as about specific cases and initiatives they have undertaken to reduce crime and enforce quality of life offenses. Commanders are expected to demonstrate a detailed knowledge of the crime and quality of life problems existing within their commands and to develop innovative and flexible tactics to address them.

As noted above, the weekly COMPSTAT meetings are but one facet of the department's comprehensive system by which is monitored and used to evaluate the department's performance. There are also pre-COMPSTAT briefings convened at the local patrol borough level, Precinct Management Team meetings in each precinct and strategy evaluation projects conducted by ranking members of the department. In addition, the police commissioner meets with New York City's mayor on a weekly basis to brief them on the department's activities and performance.

The police commissioner also provides the mayor with a formal report capturing much of the data contained within the CompStat Report. Finally, a great deal of the CompStat data and other indices of performance are provided to the public through inclusion in the Mayor's Management Report. This report and the preliminary report issued four months into the fiscal year provide detailed comparative data on the performance of every mayoral agency within city government. The process permits personnel at all levels to monitor and assess the effectiveness of their efforts and re-direct those efforts when necessary.

Technology
Because it often relies on underlying software tools, CompStat has sometimes been confused for a software program in itself. This is a fundamental misconception. CompStat often does, however, incorporate crime mapping systems and a commercial or internally developed database collection system. In some cases, police departments have started offering information to the public through their own websites. In other cases, police departments can either create their own XML feed or use a third party to display data on a map. The largest of these is CrimeReports.com, used by thousands of agencies nationwide.

Impact
Research is mixed on whether CompStat had an impact on crime rates. A 2021 study found no evidence that CompStat had an impact on serious crime, but the study did find substantial evidence that the program led police to engage in substantial data manipulation.

Some, such as University of Chicago economist Steven Levitt, have argued that COMPSTAT's crime-reducing effects have been minor. 
The introduction of COMPSTAT happened alongside: 
 The training and deployment of around 5,000 new better-educated police officers
 The integration of New York's housing and transit police into the New York Police Department
 Police decision-making being devolved to precinct level
 The clearing of a backlog of 50,000 unserved warrants
 Robust "zero tolerance" campaign against petty crime and anti-social behavior under Mayor Giuliani and Police Commissioner Bill Bratton
 Widespread removal of graffiti
 Programs that moved over 500,000 people into jobs from welfare at a time of economic buoyancy 
 Housing vouchers to enable poor families to move to better neighborhoods
 Gentrification, displacement of lower income individuals more likely to commit crimes from gentrifying or gentrified communities 
 Demographic changes including a generation raised in the social welfare systems started in the 1970s and 1980s 
 End of the crack epidemic and a shift to a marijuana-based drug economy with a larger consumer base and less competition 
 Advances in emergency medicine allowing more victims to survive
 A further reduction in the lead contaminants in the environment

Another criticism of the COMPSTAT program is that it may discourage officers from taking crime reports in order to create a false appearance of a reduction of community problems. According to journalist Radley Balko, "some recent reports from New York City suggest the program needs some tweaking to guard against the twin dangers of unnecessary police harassment and underreporting of serious crimes." An anonymous survey of "hundreds of retired high-ranking police officials . . . found that tremendous pressure to reduce crime, year after year, prompted some supervisors and precinct commanders to distort crime statistics."

Similarly, crimes may be reported but downplayed as less significant, to manipulate statistics. As an illustration, before a department begins using CompStat it might list 100 assaults as aggravated and 500 as simple assault. If there were a similar pattern of underlying criminal activity the next year, but instead 550 assaults are listed in CompStat as simple and 50 as aggravated, the system would report that progress had been made reducing major crimes when in fact, the only difference is in how they are reported.

Manipulating reporting data may also negatively affect personnel and financial disbursement; communities whose improvements (on paper) show they need less resources could lose those resources—and still face the same amount of actual crime on the streets.

Many of these negative effects in the possible weaknesses of the COMPSTAT system were dramatized in HBO's The Wire, as part of an overarching theme of systemic dysfunction in institutions. Indeed, "[o]ne of the central themes of the critically acclaimed HBO series . . . was the pressure politicians put on police brass, who then apply it to the department’s middle management, to generate PR-friendly statistics about lowering crime and increasing arrests."  In the show, this was referred to as "juking the stats".

The issue was further publicized in 2010 when NYPD officer Adrian Schoolcraft released recordings of his superiors urging him to manipulate data.

In 2014 Justice Quarterly published an article stating that there was statistical evidence of the NYPD manipulating CompStat data.

NYPD Captains Endowment Association
On June 24, 2020, the NYPD Captains Endowment Association president, Chris Monahan, wrote a letter to then NYC Mayor Bill de Blasio and Police Commissioner Dermot Shea calling for the NYPD to end its use of COMPSTAT. His criticisms of COMPSTAT include dividing police and the community, particularly black and brown communities, and increasing the chances of officers engaging in street encounters.

When Compstat was developed under then Police Commissioner Bill Bratton, high-ranking police officials widely incorporated the "stop, question and frisk". Statistically, no relationship between stop-and-frisk and crime seems apparent. A 2016 Brennan Center analysis showed part of New York remaining safer was the introduction of CompStat. CompStat detractors say it helped fuel harassment of hundreds of thousands of black and brown New Yorkers. Cities including Houston and Phoenix saw similar declines and attributed them mostly to economic development and community policing.

TrafficStat
The NYPD's TrafficStat was modeled after CompStat.   TrafficStat tracks motor vehicle, bicyclist, and pedestrian crashes.

Examples of police departments that use CompStat

Canada
 Halifax Regional Police
 Vancouver Police Department

United States
Austin, TX

Baltimore, MD, where the system is called Citistat. In 2007, then Governor of Maryland Martin O'Malley implemented Maryland StateStat, the first statewide performance management system based on CompStat.

Los Angeles, CA

Nashville, TN
New Haven, CT
Oakland, CA

Philadelphia, PA

San Francisco, CA

San Juan, Puerto Rico
Washington, DC
Detroit, MI
New York, NY where statistics are available to the public through the NYPD CompStat 2.0 Website.
Nampa, ID

In popular culture 
 In the CBS TV series The District, inspired by the real-life experience of former New York Deputy Police Commissioner Jack Maple, statistics clerk Ella Mae Farmer (played by Lynne Thigpen) was shown to be a wiz at using the system, which proved invaluable to the success of Washington, D.C. Police Chief Jack Mannion and to the department, and which contributed to her promotion from an obscure position located in an out-of-the-way office to Director of Administrative Services.
 The system is shown in use in Baltimore, Maryland, in The Wire on HBO, though in the show it is referred to as "ComStat". (Baltimore's real-life system is called Citistat.)
 The podcast Reply All aired two episodes regarding CompStat, titled "The Crime Machine Part I" and "The Crime Machine Part II".

See also
 Crime mapping

References

Further reading

 Crime and Restoring Order: What America Can Learn from New York's Finest by William J. Bratton
 The Growth of CompStat in American Policing By David Weisburd, Stephen D. Mastrofski, Rosann Greenspan, and James J. Willis
 CompStat and Organizational Change in the Lowell Police Department
 Steven Levitt's Understanding Why Crime Fell in the 1990s: Four Factors that Explain the Decline and Six that Do Not
 The Trouble With CompStat
 Ford Foundation Report: "Mapping Crime in Philadelphia" Winter 2001
 COMPSTAT AND CITISTAT: SHOULD WORCESTER ADOPT THESE MANAGEMENT TECHNIQUES?
 Crime Analysis Reporting and Mapping for Small Agencies: A Low-cost and Simplified Approach
 New York City TrafficStat

External links

 How CompStat Began, an Interview with creator Jack Maple
 CompStat and Its Enemies, City Journal Online, 2-16-10
 Metropolitan Police Department, Washington, DC Crime Mapping
 Philadelphia Police Department COMPSTAT
 City of Baltimore Citistat
 The Trouble With CompStat
 San Francisco CompStat

Law enforcement techniques
New York City Police Department
Law enforcement databases in the United States
Crime mapping
Crime statistics